Christopher Lachlan "Lochie" Daddo (born 14 March 1970 in Sydney) is an Australian actor and television presenter. His older brothers are actors Andrew and Cameron Daddo, and Andrew's twin, Jamie Daddo.

Career
Upon finishing school in Melbourne in 1987, Lochie Daddo began a horticulture course and worked as a landscape gardener for six months. Lochie's passion for exploration and adventure led him on numerous ventures through the Whitsundays and across Europe.

Upon returning to Australia in 1990, he took up an offer from a modelling agency and soon after began his television career. He first appeared as host of travel show Getaway during the mid-1990s for six years.

From 1992 to 1993, he portrayed the role of Stephen Gottlieb in Neighbours. He appeared in 1995 in an episode of the ABC series G.P., Out  as Patrick Walsh the romantic interest of the series' regular gay character Dr. Martin Dempsey played by Damian Rice. In 2005, he appeared on the series Blue Water High.

Throughout his career, he has worked as an actor, reporter and presenter for all the major Australian networks, on everything from entertainment news to current affairs including Let’s Do It, E! News, Entertainment Tonight, Today and Animal Hospital.

He has also hosted corporate and training videos for numerous major Australian corporations including Qantas, the NRMA, the Commonwealth Bank and Telstra as well as a spokesperson for the 40 Hour Famine.

In May 2007 Lochie Daddo appeared as one of the celebrity performers on the celebrity reality singing TV show It Takes Two. He was the first to be eliminated from the show on 15 May 2007.

He is married to Foxtel's Karina Brown with whom he has two daughters.

References

External links

1970 births
Living people
Australian male television actors
Australian television presenters
Australian people of Cornish descent
Australian people of Italian descent
Male actors from Sydney
Male actors from Melbourne